The Locust Years is the third studio album by the progressive metal band Hammers of Misfortune. The album was issued in 2006 and reissued in 2010 by Metal Blade Records.

Track listing

Personnel

Musicians 
Chewy - drums
Jamie Myers - vocals, bass guitar
Mike Scalzi - vocals, guitar
Sigrid Sheie - acoustic and electric piano, Hammond B3, backing vocals
John Cobbett - electric, lead and acoustic guitars

References

2006 albums
Hammers of Misfortune albums